Huizhou West railway station on the Beijing–Kowloon railway and Huizhou–Dayawan railway. It is located in Huicheng District, Huizhou, Guangdong Province, China.

The station is relatively remote when compared to those on the more modern Dongguan–Huizhou intercity railway. In December 2017, the limited passenger service was removed.

The Huizhou–Dayawan railway departs from Beijing–Kowloon railway immediately east of this station.

References

Railway stations in Guangdong
Buildings and structures in Huizhou
Stations on the Beijing–Kowloon Railway